"Up All Night" is a song by English indie rock band Young Knives and is featured on their third studio album, Superabundance. The second single taken from the album, it was released on 25 February 2008 and reached a peak position of #45 in the UK Singles Chart.

Track listing
CD
"Up All Night" – 2:59
"Stand and Deliver" (Adam and the Ants cover) – 3:08
"Up All Night" (Live) – 3:32

2008 singles
2008 songs
Transgressive Records singles